Eastern Suburbs was an electoral district of the Legislative Assembly in the Australian state of New South Wales. It was created as a five-member electorate with the introduction of proportional representation in 1920, replacing Bondi, Randwick, Waverley and Woollahra and named after and situated in Sydney's Eastern Suburbs. It was abolished in 1927 and replaced by Bondi, Coogee, Randwick, Vaucluse, Waverley and Woollahra.

Members for Eastern Suburbs

Election results

References

Former electoral districts of New South Wales
1920 establishments in Australia
1927 disestablishments in Australia
Constituencies established in 1920
Constituencies disestablished in 1927